Rita de Santis (BCL’80, McGill University) is a Canadian politician, who was a member of the National Assembly of Quebec for the riding of Bourassa-Sauvé from 2012 to 2018. She was first elected in the 2012 election as a member of the Quebec Liberal Party caucus.

From April 23, 2014 to January 28, 2016, she was the Parliamentary Assistant to the Minister responsible for Government Administration and Ongoing Program Review (open and transparent government).

On January 28, 2016, she was appointed to the cabinet as Minister Responsible for Access to Information and Reform of Democratic Institutions.

She retired from politics in 2018.

References

Living people
Quebec Liberal Party MNAs
Women MNAs in Quebec
Politicians from Montreal
Canadian people of Italian descent
21st-century Canadian politicians
21st-century Canadian women politicians
Members of the Executive Council of Quebec
Women government ministers of Canada
1954 births
McGill University Faculty of Law alumni